The Globo d'oro (internationally known as Italian Golden Globe) is an Italian annual film award. It was established in 1960 and it has as jury the Rome Foreign Press Association.

The first awards ceremony took place in 1960 and was won by the film The Facts of Murder by Pietro Germi.

The edition 1981 - 1982 saw the participation of the President of the Italian Republic Sandro Pertini.

The prizes
 Golden Globe for Best Film 
 Golden Globe for Best First Feature s
 Golden Globe for Best Director 
 Golden Globe for Best Actor 
 Golden Globe for Best Actress 
 Golden Globe for Best Actor revelation 
 Golden Globe for Best Actress revelation 
 Golden Globe for Best Screenplay 
 Golden Globe for Best Film 
 Golden Globe for the Best Short Film 
 Golden Globe for Best Music 
 Golden Globe for Career 
 Golden Globe for Best European Film

References

External links
 Official site

Italian film awards
Awards established in 1960
1960 establishments in Italy